"She's In Love" is a song written by Keith Stegall and Dan Hill, and recorded by American country music artist Mark Wills.  It was released in June 1999 as the fourth and final single from his album Wish You Were Here and it was his seventh single overall; it later appears on his Greatest Hits package. It peaked at #7 on the U.S. US Billboard Hot Country Singles & Tracks chart.

Content
In the song, the narrator sings of how a friend of his has told him that she has fallen in love, and they swear to "stay in touch" and that she'll be his friend "till the day I die." The narrator notes all of the characteristics that show him that she truly has fallen in love and that it is not just something temporary; he then reflects that he wishes it were he.

Critical reception
A review in Billboard was positive, stating that Wills' "sensitive rendering of the lyric gives the song additional emotional impact".

Music video
The music video was directed by Charley Randazzo and premiered in June 1999.

Chart performance
"She's in Love" debuted at #65 on Billboard's Hot Country Singles & Tracks for the week of June 19, 1999.

Year-end charts

References

1999 singles
1998 songs
Mark Wills songs
Songs written by Dan Hill
Songs written by Keith Stegall
Song recordings produced by Carson Chamberlain
Mercury Nashville singles